Wu Kwok Hung (22 May 1949 – 15 June 2015), nicknamed "Big Head", was a former Hong Kong professional football player.

Club career
Wu played in the Hong Kong First Division League for teams including Tung Sing, South China and Seiko as a midfielder.

Wu joined Tung Sing in 1968 and played in the team for 3 years. In 1971–72, he played with South China. After that, he joined Seiko, where he helped the club to win more than 40 trophies in 14 years, including the 1983–84 championship and Senior Viceroy Cup.

Wu also won many individual prizes, including 4 consecutive time winner of Hong Kong Footballer of the Year between 1979 and 1982, and was part of Hong Kong's famous 1985 World Cup qualifying victory in China that ended the hopes of the mainland reaching the Mexico World Cup finals the following year.

After the 1985–86 season, Seiko withdrew from the league and Wu also retired from professional football. A testimonial match for Wu was held which attracted a full house at the then 28,000 seaters Hong Kong Stadium, proving his huge popularity with the fans.

Death
Wu died on 15 June 2015 at the Pamela Youde Nethersole Eastern Hospital from laryngeal cancer, aged 66.

Honours

Club
South China
Hong Kong First Division: 1971–72
Hong Kong Senior Shield: 1971–72

Seiko
Hong Kong First Division: 1972–73, 1974–75, 1978–79, 1979–80, 1980–81, 1981–82, 1982–83, 1983–84, 1984–85
Hong Kong Senior Shield: 1972–73, 1973–74, 1975–76, 1976–77, 1978–79, 1979–80, 1980–81, 1984–85
Hong Kong FA Cup: 1974–75, 1975–76, 1977–78, 1979–80, 1980–81, 1985–86
Hong Kong Viceroy Cup: 1972–73, 1977–78, 1978–79, 1983–84, 1984–85, 1985–86

Individual
-Hong Kong Footballer of the Year: 1979, 1980, 1981, 1982

References

1949 births
2015 deaths
Hong Kong footballers
Hong Kong international footballers
South China AA players
Seiko SA players
Hong Kong First Division League players
Association football midfielders
Deaths from cancer in Hong Kong
Deaths from laryngeal cancer